Chaiken, a surname of Yiddish origin, may refer to:

People 
 David Chaiken, computer programmer and developer of X2x
 Ilene Chaiken, creator, writer and executive producer of the television series The L Word
 Ilya Chaiken, US-American film director and screenwriter
Jen Chaiken, an American film producer
Julie Chaiken, an American fashion designer
 Shelly Chaiken, US-American psychologist

See also 
 Chaikin